Chinese Studio is a 5-minute English radio program that is a Chinese lesson that occurs at the end of each China Radio International broadcast.  For example, at the end of China Drive, this program will air.

The Chinese lessons are usually an entertaining dialogue between a non-Chinese male and a Chinese female.

General Theme of the Program
The theme is generally done on a week by week basis with one topic per week and a lesson review on Sundays.  For example, if the lesson is about purchasing a car, the words used in the lessons will be focused around that theme for the entire week.

Air Personalities
 Yajie - a lady who has been with the program the longest
 Brendan (the current male non-Chinese host, as of April 16, 2007)

Past Hosts
 Cam (the previous male non-Chinese host, until April 15, 2007)
 Michael
 Raymond
 James
 Chris
 Shanshan (Sit-in for Yajie, ep. 111)
 (others not listed)

See also
 Travel In Chinese, the television segment on CCTV International, also a Chinese language lesson hosted by Dashan.

External links
 Official Website (archived)

Chinese radio programs
China Radio International